Stanford is a census-designated place (CDP) in the northwest corner of Santa Clara County, California, United States. It is the home of Stanford University. The population was 21,150 at the 2020 census.

Stanford is an unincorporated area of Santa Clara County and is adjacent to the city of Palo Alto.

The place is named after Stanford University. Most of the Stanford University campus and other core University owned land is situated within the census-designated place of Stanford though the Stanford University Medical Center, the Stanford Shopping Center, and the Stanford Research Park are officially part of the city of Palo Alto. Its resident population consists of the inhabitants of on-campus housing, including graduate student residences and single-family homes and condominiums owned by their faculty inhabitants but located on leased Stanford land.  A residential neighborhood adjacent to the Stanford campus, College Terrace, featuring streets named after universities and colleges, is neither part of the Stanford CDP nor owned by the University (except for a few individual houses) but is instead part of Palo Alto.

Geography
Stanford is located at  (37.422590, −122.165413).

Climate
This region experiences warm, dry summers, with no average monthly temperatures above 77.6 °F (25.3 °C), and cool, wet winters, with no average monthly temperatures below 37.7 °F (3.2 °C). According to the Köppen Climate Classification system, Stanford has a warm-summer Mediterranean climate, abbreviated "Csb" on climate maps.

Demographics

2010
At the 2010 census Stanford had a population of 13,809. The racial makeup of Stanford was 7,932 (57.4%) White, 651 (4.7%) African American, 86 (0.6%) Native American, 3,777 (27.4%) Asian, 28 (0.2%) Pacific Islander, 263 (1.9%) from other races, and 1,072 (7.8%) from two or more races. Hispanic or Latino people of any race were 1,439 persons (10.4%).

The census reported that 55.6% of the population lived in households and 44.4% lived in non-institutionalized group quarters.

There were 3,913 households, 517 (13.2%) had children under the age of 18 living in them, 1,159 (29.6%) were opposite-sex married couples living together, 47 (1.2%) had a female householder with no husband present, 24 (0.6%) had a male householder with no wife present.  There were 159 (4.1%) unmarried opposite-sex partnerships, and 15 (0.4%) same-sex married couples or partnerships. 1,522 households (38.9%) were one person and 87 (2.2%) had someone living alone who was 65 or older. The average household size was 1.96.  There were 1,230 families (31.4% of households); the average family size was 2.77.

The age distribution was 917 people (6.6%) under the age of 18, 7,914 people (57.3%) aged 18 to 24, 3,595 people (26.0%) aged 25 to 44, 762 people (5.5%) aged 45 to 64, and 621 people (4.5%) who were 65 or older.  The median age was 22.6 years. For every 100 females, there were 118.3 males.  For every 100 females age 18 and over, there were 120.1 males.

There were 3,999 housing units at an average density of 1,440.6 per square mile, of the occupied units 790 (20.2%) were owner-occupied and 3,123 (79.8%) were rented. The homeowner vacancy rate was 0.9%; the rental vacancy rate was 0.9%.  2,022 people (14.6% of the population) lived in owner-occupied housing units and 5,657 people (41.0%) lived in rental housing units.

2000
At the 2000 census there were 13,314 people, 3,207 households, and 1,330 families living in the CDP. The racial makeup of the CDP was 60.40% White, 4.90% Black or African American, 0.72% Native American, 25.57% Asian, 0.16% Pacific Islander, 3.65% from other races, and 4.60% from two or more races.  8.96% of the population were Hispanics or Latinos of any race.
Of the 3,207 households 17.9% had children under the age of 18 living with them, 38.7% were married couples living together, 1.8% had a female householder with no husband present, and 58.5% were non-families. 23.0% of households were one person and 2.5% were one person aged 65 or older.  The average household size was 2.22 and the average family size was 2.73.

The age distribution was 7.2% under the age of 18, 58.5% from 18 to 25, 23.7% from 25 to 45, 6.1% from 45 to 65, and 4.4% 65 or older. The median age was 22 years. For every 100 females, there were 118.0 males.  For every 100 females age 18 and over, there were 119.4 males.

The median household income was $41,106 and the median family income was $88,596. Males had a median income of $67,250 versus $56,991 for females. The per capita income for the CDP was $22,443.  About 11.1% of families and 21.4% of the population were below the poverty line, including 11.6% of those under age 18 and 1.8% of those age 65 or over.

Politics
The area is strongly Democratic, with 54% registered with the Democratic Party and 15% registered with the Republican Party.

Education
The Stanford CDP is part of the Palo Alto Unified School District which serves students k-12. Two of the district's schools are within the boundaries of the CDP:  Escondido Elementary School and Lucille M. Nixon Elementary School.

Preschools in the CDP include the Bing Nursery School, run by the university's School of Humanities and Sciences, and the Children's Center of the Stanford Community, a parent-teacher cooperative.

Notable people

The following are people who were either born or spent a significant part of their childhood living in Stanford, California.

 Sam Bankman-Fried (b. 1992), co-founder of FTX
 John Gall (b. 1978), former Major League Baseball outfielder and first baseman, played for the St. Louis Cardinals and the Florida Marlins
 Marco Zappacosta (b. 1985), co-founder and CEO of Thumbtack

See also 

 Stanford University

References

Census-designated places in Santa Clara County, California
Stanford University